Frances Duca is a Maltese Australian actress.  She was nominated for the 2017 AACTA Award for Best Actress in a Supporting Role for her role in Ali's Wedding.

References

External links
 Frances Duca
 

Australian film actresses
Living people
Year of birth missing (living people)
Maltese emigrants to Australia
Miss World 1980 delegates